"God" is a song by American singer-songwriter and musician Tori Amos. It was released as the fourth single from her second studio album Under the Pink. It was released as the album's lead single in North America on February 3, 1994, as the second single on May 2 in Australia, and as the fourth single on October 3 in the UK. The song reached number 44 on the UK Singles Chart as well as number one on the US Billboard Modern Rock Tracks chart. It became Amos' first single to chart on the Billboard Hot 100, peaking at number 72.

Releases
The B-sides to the American release include Tori Amos' reworking of "Home on the Range" with new lyrics as well as a two-song instrumental piano suite. An American cassette single includes the B-side "Sister Janet". A different single was released in Europe on CD, 12-inch vinyl, 7-inch vinyl, and cassette. The 7-inch single is a glossy, dual-sided picture disc. The various formats include ambient and jungle house remixes of the track by CJ Bolland, Carl Craig, and the Joy.

Music video
The music video for "God" directed by Melodie McDaniel features Amos in a variety of religiously-themed situations, such as a scene visually comparing a tefillin used by a rabbi with a basketball player using a belt while injecting drugs. The video is often remembered for scenes of Amos singing in front of a lit candle, dancing with a plethora of brown rats (possibly at the Rat temple); this was commented on in an episode of the television show Beavis and Butt-head, and parodying a snake cult.

Track listings

US maxi-CD single; Australian and cassette CD single
 "God" (LP version) – 3:55
 "Home on the Range" (Cherokee edition) – 5:25
 Piano Suite: "All the Girls Hate Her"
 Piano Suite: "Over It"

US cassette single
 "God" (LP version)
 "Sister Janet"

UK and European CD single
 "God" – 3:58
 "God" (The Dharma Kayã mix) – 12:34
 "God" (The Rainforest Resort mix) – 10:32
 "God" (The Thinking mix 2) – 9:50

UK 12-inch single
 "God" (The Thinking mix 2)
 "God" (a cappella vocal and Rain mix)
 "God" (The Rainforest Resort mix)
 "God" (The CJ Bolland mix)

UK 7-inch picture disc and cassette single
 "God"
 "God" (a cappella vocal and Rain Mix)

Charts

Release history

References

External links
 

1994 singles
1994 songs
Albums with cover art by Dave McKean
Atlantic Records singles
East West Records singles
Song recordings produced by Eric Rosse
Songs critical of religion
Songs written by Tori Amos
Tori Amos songs